Seascape with Sharks and Dancer is a 1974 play by Don Nigro. The story focuses on a young man, Ben, who saves a young woman named Tracy from the ocean outside his beach house. The struggle between his more tolerant approach to life and her fear of human relationships becomes the main conflict in the play.

This fine work in the Pendragon cycle of plays enjoyed a sold out, critically acclaimed production at the world famous Oregon Shakespeare Festival. It was originally produced at the Theatre Barn at the University of Massachusetts in Amherst, in the spring of 1974, directed by Marya Bednerik.

Plot summary 
The play begins on the night librarian/aspiring writer Ben rescues a beautiful naked woman, Tracy, from the ocean and brings her into his Cape Cod beach house to recuperate. Tracy claims it was not a suicide attempt but that she was dancing in the ocean. Ben doubts this but does his best to take care of her. Soon the two find that they have conflicting personalities, but try to work through them and gradually get closer to one another.  Ben is fascinated and amused by her feisty behavior and eccentric sense of humor and falls for her. Tracy's first impulse is to break their connection, out of fear of the pain of loving someone and then inevitably losing them. As the story continues we see them struggling to find a way to save their difficult relationship, which is constantly threatened by Tracy's serious trust issues. After a crisis involving the possibility of an unexpected pregnancy, Tracy is finally able to reveal the origins of her fear of attachment in her childhood horror at the meaningless suffering of innocent creatures. The indifference of the universe to the suffering of the innocent is embodied for her in the eyes of the sharks in the ocean. The relationship with Ben has brought to the surface all of her deepest anxieties and fears.

Themes

Love and Trust 
"Seascape With Sharks and Dancer" looks at love and trust in a very unconventional way.  Although Ben and Tracy care about each other, and Ben outwardly shows his love for Tracy, past events in her life make it difficult for her to trust him.  She is constantly torn between her need for love and her fear of the pain it causes. In finally trusting Ben enough to open up to him and share her deepest and most secret fears, she's taken an important step towards creating a lasting relationship with him. But whether any trust between men and women is actually possible remains, at the end of the play, an open question.

References

External links
 YouTube review
 Chicago reader article
 https://www.umass.edu/theater/

1974 plays
American plays